Anita Ayoob (also written as Anita Ayub and Aneeta Ayoob) is a former Pakistani actress and model, who appeared in Bollywood films, Pakistani films, television and advertisements in the 1980s and 1990s. She had a brief, but a controversial career in India and Pakistan and was rumoured to have a close relationship with underworld don, Dawood Ibrahim. She made her Bollywood debut in 1993 with film Pyar Ka Tarana, which was written and directed by Dev Anand. However, she made her acting debut with a Pakistani television serial Gardish. She acted again in Dev Anand's 1994 film, Gangster. She also appeared in Pakistani TV series, Hasina-E Alam in 1992.

As a model, she represented her country in Miss Asia Pacific International beauty pageant held in Manila, Philippines in 1989. She was forced to withdraw from the beauty contest when she made a controversial remark on polygamy during the contest.

After appearing in some movies in India and Pakistan, she has settled in New York, when she could not get her working visa extended in India.

Fashion Central, a Pakistan based online fashion magazine wrote that Ayub was blamed to be Pakistani spy, was allegedly involved in Bombay blast.

Filmography and television 
 1995, Doosra Raasta (TV Series)
 1994, Sub Ke Baap
 1994, Gangster (as Anita Ayoob)
 1994, Chaltee Ka Naam Gaari
 1994, Maria (Short)
 1993, Pyaar Ka Tarana
 1992, Hasina-E Alam (TV Series)
 1987, Gardish (TV Series)

Personal life 
Ayoob married Saumil Patel, an Indian Gujarati businessman in the late 1990s. After her marriage, she shifted to New York. She has a son named Shazer with Saumil Patel. After her divorce with Patel, she was married to Subak Majeed, a Pakistani businessman. She also has a half brother

The underworld connection 
Ayoob was reported to be very close to Dawood Ibrahim. A producer named Javed Siddique was allegedly shot dead by Dawood's gang in 1995, when the producer refused to cast Anita in a Hindi film.

Controversy 
In 1989, she participated in the Miss Asia Pacific International beauty pageant, where she made a controversial remark on polygamy during the contest in Manila, Philippines. She was quoted as saying, "Muslim women should be allowed to have four spouses, just as Muslim men can take four wives at any one time." After her statement, she was forced to withdraw from the contest. She was accused of preaching immorality by outraged Pakistanis. In January 1989, 22 lawyers demanded that she should clarify her statement. A case was filed against her in Pakistan, terming her alleged statement "illegal and immoral".

In 1995, producer Javed Siddique was allegedly killed by Dawood's gang when he refused to cast Ayoob in his film.

References

External links 
 
 Aneeta Ayoob Exclusive, an interview on Lehren

Living people
Pakistani film actresses
Actresses in Hindi cinema
Pakistani television actresses
21st-century Pakistani actresses
Pakistani Muslims
Year of birth missing (living people)